Chi Ursae Majoris or χ Ursae Majoris, formally named Taiyangshou , is a single star in the northern circumpolar constellation of Ursa Major. The star has an orange hue and is visible to the naked eye at night with an apparent visual magnitude of 3.72. It is located at a distance of approximately 184 light-years from the Sun based on parallax, but is drifting closer with a radial velocity of −9 km/s.

Nomenclature 

χ Ursae Majoris (Latinised to Chi Ursae Majoris) is the star's Bayer designation.

It bore the traditional name Tai Yang Show, "the Sun Governor", from Chinese astronomy. The name was possibly derived from the word 太陽守, Pinyin: Tàiyángshǒu, meaning Guard of the Sun, because this star is marking itself and standing alone in the Guard of the Sun asterism, Purple Forbidden enclosure (see : Chinese constellations). It also bore traditional names of Arabic origin:  Alkafzah, Alkaphrah, and El Koprah.

In 2016, the IAU organized a Working Group on Star Names (WGSN) to catalog and standardize proper names for stars. The WGSN approved the name Taiyangshou for this star on 30 June 2017 and it is now so included in the List of IAU-approved Star Names.

Properties 

Chi Ursae Majoris is an evolved, orange hued K-type giant with a stellar classification of K0.5 IIIb. It is a red clump giant, which means it is on the horizontal branch and is generating energy through helium fusion at its core. This star has expanded to  times the radius of the Sun with 1.49 times the Sun's mass. It is radiating 158 times the luminosity of the Sun from its enlarged photosphere at an effective temperature of 4,416 K.

The spiral galaxy in Ursa Major, NGC 3877 (= H I.201), type Sc, is best found from Chi Ursae Majoris, which is almost exactly 15 arcminutes north of the galaxy.

References

External links
 

K-type giants
Horizontal-branch stars

Ursa Major (constellation)
Ursae Majoris, Chi
BD+48 1966
Ursae Majoris, 63
102224
057399
4518
Taiyangshou